Acanthosaura rubrilabris, the  red-lipped horned tree lizard or red-lipped horned agamid, is a species of agama found in China.

References

rubrilabris
Reptiles of China
Reptiles described in 2022